Veritas Stadion is an association football stadium in Turku, Finland. It is situated in the district of Kupittaa, in an area dedicated to sporting venues. The stadium serves as the home venue for FC Inter Turku and Turun Palloseura playing in Finland's premier football league, the Veikkausliiga.

The stadium underwent an expansion in 2009, when a stand with 1,644 seats was built to meet the demands for the UEFA Women's Euro 2009.
The stadium has a capacity of 9,372 spectators, with 8,072 seats and 1,300 standing places.

In Veritas Stadion there are two stands opposite to each other. The old Olympic stand (Olympiakatsomo) was built for the 1952 Summer Olympics and the new, modern main stand was ready in 2003. After that the name of the stadium was changed to Veritas Stadion, having formerly been known simply as the "Kupittaa football stadium" (Kupittaan jalkapallostadion). 
The old Kupittaa Stadium's record attendance was approximately 15,000 spectators for the 1987–88 UEFA Cup match between Turun Palloseura and Italian giants Inter Milan. The attendance record of 9,125 spectators was set at a match between Inter Turku and Kuopion Palloseura in 2019.

References
1952 Summer Olympics official report. pp. 62–3.
 Veritas Stadion - Official site.

Venues of the 1952 Summer Olympics
Olympic football venues
FC Inter Turku
Football venues in Finland
Buildings and structures in Turku
TPS (football)
Tourist attractions in Turku
Sports venues completed in 1952
1952 establishments in Finland